Yegor Strelkovskiy (born 6 March 2002) is a Belarusian professional footballer who plays for Shakhtyor Petrikov.

References

External links 
 
 

2002 births
Living people
Belarusian footballers
Association football defenders
FC Energetik-BGU Minsk players
FC Shakhtyor Petrikov players